"Hold On" is a song by Scottish singer KT Tunstall, written by Tunstall and produced by Steve Osborne for Tunstall's second album, Drastic Fantastic (2007). The song was released as the album's first single on 16 July 2007 in the United States. It was then released in the United Kingdom as a download single on 13 August 2007 and as a CD and 7-inch single on 27 August 2007. "Hold On" peaked at number 21 on the UK Singles Chart, number 19 in Norway, and number 26 in Italy and Switzerland. In North America, the song reached number 46 in Canada and number four on the US Billboard Bubbling Under Hot 100, topping the Billboard Adult Alternative Songs chart for 11 weeks.

Critical reception
"Hold On" received mixed reviews from music critics. Billboard magazine's Susan Visakowitz called the song an "exhilarating three-minute ride" and "infectious and convincing". Internet publication Stereogum said that the song was "not bad" but questioned its commercial potential. Michael Slezak, in a review for Entertainment Weekly, was less impressed with the song, writing that "the melody lacks the immediate snap, crackle, pop of her previous hits". This song appeared at number 55 on Rolling Stones list of the "100 Best Songs of 2007".

Chart performance
In the United Kingdom, "Hold On" debuted at number 34 on 19 August 2007 on download sales only. Two weeks later, after the song was released physically, the song jumped eighteen places to a new peak of 21. In Canada, the song was released on 13 August 2007. Two weeks later, it debuted at number 46 on the Canadian Hot 100 and at number 20 on the Digital Singles chart. "Hold On" peaked on the United States' Billboard Bubbling Under Hot 100 Singles chart at number four, a position roughly equal to number 104 on the Hot 100. In its eight week on the Billboard Hot Adult Top 40 Tracks chart the song reached number 27. It also reached number one on the Adult Alternative Songs chart (also known as the Triple A chart) for 11 weeks.

Music video
The music video premiered in July 2007 on MTV's Total Request Live. On BET's 106 & Park, it premiered in August 2007. On Yahoo! Music, it premiered on 30 July 2007. In it, Tunstall is transported back-and-forth between different worlds of dance after plugging in her guitar, which she throws away to join in on the action with other dancers.

Track listings

UK CD single
 "Hold On"
 "Journey"

UK 7-inch single
A. "Hold On"
B. "Suddenly I See" (live)

UK DVD single
 "Hold On" (music video)
 "Hold On" (behind the scenes video)
 "Hopeless" (live acoustic + photo gallery)

European enhanced maxi-single
 "Hold On"
 "Journey"
 "Hold On" (video)

US promo CD
 "Hold On" – 2:58
 "Hold On" (instrumental) – 2:58

Personnel
Personnel are lifted from the UK 7-inch single liner notes.
 KT Tunstall – writing, vocals, semi-acoustic guitar, cello intro
 Luke Bullen – drums, percussion
 Steve Osborne – producing, keyboards
 Arnulf Linder – cello, double bass
 Kenny Dickenson – keyboard arrangement
 Ed Case – writing
 Richard Morris – engineering
 Michael H. Brauer – mixing
 Will Hensley – Pro Tools engineering and mixing assistant

Charts

Release history

References

2007 singles
2007 songs
KT Tunstall songs
Relentless Records singles
Songs written by KT Tunstall
Virgin Records singles